Sandhills is a small hamlet located between the villages of Wormley and Brook in Surrey, UK.  It is part of the Surrey Hills Area of Outstanding Beauty and situated on the Green Sand Way.

There is a common owned by the National Trust, and a Donkey sanctuary, founded by John and Kay Lockwood in the 1950s and now operated by the RSPCA.

References

See also
Surrey

Hamlets in Surrey